Thistley Hough Academy is a coeducational secondary school located in the village of Penkhull in Stoke-on-Trent, Staffordshire, England. The school was built in 1938 as a girls' grammar school, housed in a classical Art Deco building. The old building has since been demolished and a new £15,000,000 school has been constructed. In September 2011, the new building's opening ceremony took place. The new building was opened in May 2013 by the Chairman of Stoke City Football Club, Peter Coates.

Admissions
Admissions are non-selective. Students can be of any religion or none, and the school does not provide religious instruction. Though the school was initially a girls' school, the school now admits male pupils.

History
The school was first opened in 1938. The current academy colours, green and purple, date from the school's inception as a grammar school for girls. The first headmistress, Miss Bamber, was a member of the suffragette movement. Local pottery companies donated pieces of pottery for the school's reception area. The pottery is still displayed in the school library today.

Site
In the 1970s, the school was expanded. The new section cost £2 million.

In 1994, the school was refurbished.

In 2013, the new buildings were constructed as part of the government's Schools for the Future Sceme. The site of the demolished old school was converted into parking space and sports facilities. The school was reopened under head teacher Holly Hartley.

Robert Haines
In 2014, former ex-head teacher Robert Haines jailed for 16 months for 8 child sex offences. He had been suspended in 2012 as allegations came to light, and admitted his offences in the Stoke-on-Trent Crown Court.

Local Community
Abnormally high amounts of students are excluded from schools in the school's county. Despite the high cost at £5000 per pupil, in the 2018/2019 academic year 185 pupils were excluded from Staffordshire schools. Pupils are most often excluded from secondary schools, and were transferred from their last school with unaddressed "complex learning and behavioural needs".

There has often been complaints about pupils' "anti-social" behaviour in the local area. In 2019, increased numbers of local police were sent to patrol the school and its immediate surrounding area.

Sponsors
Thistley Hough Academy was established in September 2013 in partnership with the Creative Education Trust (CET). CET is a charity and social enterprise set up in 2011.

Thistley Hough has adopted the ‘Admissions Criteria for Community Schools’ as determined by Stoke-on-Trent Education Service.

 Children who are in the care of a local authority

 Children who have older brothers or sisters at the school at the time that they will start.

 Children who live nearest to the school as determined by a straight line measurement from the front door of the child’s home address to the main entrance of the school.

Uniform
Pupils are made to wear a plain grey jumper. Headphones are not allowed on school premises.

Notable alumni
 Neil Morrissey, actor

Thistley Hough Girls' School
 Chris Keates, General Secretary since 2004 of the NASUWT
 Ann Savours Shirley, writer and historian

References

News items
 Students should feel very proud | This is Staffordshire
 Pupils box clever as lessons called off after dispute | This is Staffordshire
 Sky's the limit for Penkhull school's cub reporters | This is Staffordshire
 7,000 tons of rubble add up to end of era | This is Staffordshire
 New regime gets school 'on track' | This is Staffordshire
 Coates urges pupils to reach their goals | This is Staffordshire
 'Striking' £15m Thistley Hough High School in Penkhull is now open for pupils | This is Staffordshire

External links
 Official website
 Ofsted inspection reports

Secondary schools in Stoke-on-Trent
Academies in Stoke-on-Trent